Thomas Gresley  may refer to:

Thomas Gresley (died 1445), MP for Staffordshire (UK Parliament constituency) and Derbyshire
Thomas Gresley (1552–1610), MP for Derbyshire (UK Parliament constituency) in 1597
 Sir Thomas Gresley, 2nd Baronet, (c.1628–1699), High Sheriff of Derbyshire 1663
 Sir Thomas Gresley, 4th Baronet (c.1699–1746), High Sheriff of Derbyshire 1724
 Sir Thomas Gresley, 5th Baronet (1722–1753), Member of Parliament (MP) for Lichfield 1753
 Sir Thomas Gresley, 10th Baronet (1832–1868), Member of Parliament for South Derbyshire